Elections will be held in Zamboanga Peninsula for seats in the House of Representatives of the Philippines on May 9, 2016.

Summary

Zamboanga City
Each of Zamboanga City's two legislative districts will elect each representative to the House of Representatives. The candidate with the highest number of votes wins the seat.

1st District
Celso Lobregat is the incumbent.

2nd District
Lilia Macrohon-Nuño is the incumbent.

Zamboanga del Norte
Each of Zamboanga del Norte's three legislative districts will elect each representative to the House of Representatives. The candidate with the highest number of votes wins the seat.

1st District
Seth Frederick Jalosjos is the incumbent.

2nd District
Rosendo S. Labadlabad is the incumbent but ineligible for reelection. His party nominated his wife, Glona Labadlabad.

3rd District
Isagani S. Amatong is the incumbent.

Zamboanga del Sur
Each of Zamboanga del Sur's two legislative districts will elect each representative to the House of Representatives. The candidate with the highest number of votes wins the seat.

1st District
Victor Yu is the incumbent, but ineligible for reelection. His party nominated his wife, Divina Grace Yu.

≥u

2nd District
Aurora Enerio-Cerilles is the incumbent.

≥u

Zamboanga Sibugay
Each of Zamboanga Sibugay's two legislative districts will elect each representative to the House of Representatives. The candidate with the highest number of votes wins the seat.

1st District
Belma A. Cabilao is the incumbent.

≥u

2nd District
Dulce Ann Hofer is the incumbent.

≥u

References

External links
COMELEC - Official website of the Philippine Commission on Elections (COMELEC)
NAMFREL - Official website of National Movement for Free Elections (NAMFREL)
PPCRV - Official website of the Parish Pastoral Council for Responsible Voting (PPCRV)

2016 Philippine general election
Lower house elections in the Zamboanga Peninsula